Rachel Nash is a New Zealand actress who has appeared in many local films and television series over the years in New Zealand. She has had several guest roles in Shortland Street, as well as appearances in Mercy Peak, Outrageous Fortune, Legend of the Seeker and The Cult. More recently she has been starring as Ingrid, reincarnated with the Norse goddess Snotra in The Almighty Johnsons.

Early life

Nash attended Lynfield College in Auckland.

Filmography

External links
 
 Rachel Nash at Kathryn Rawlings & Associates

References

Living people
New Zealand actresses
New Zealand film actresses
New Zealand television actresses
Year of birth missing (living people)
People educated at Lynfield College